Ziva Magnolya Muskitta (born March 14, 2001) is an Indonesian singer. She is known as the third place finalist on the tenth season of Indonesian Idol, broadcast by the national television channels RCTI in 2019–2020.

Life and career 
Ziva was born with the name Ziva Magnolya Muskitta on March 14, 2001. Ziva is the second child of two siblings, from the couple Stevanus Muskitta and Cindy Asie Busel.

In 2019 Ziva perform a duet with Jeremy Passion at 2019 Ramadhan Jazz Festival.

Furthermore, in 2019, at the age of 18, Ziva participated in the Indonesian Idol. And on February 17, 2020, she was eliminated and finished third.

Performances on Indonesian Idol X

Discography

Single

References

External links
 

Living people
2001 births
Indonesian child singers
21st-century Indonesian women singers
Indonesian pop singers
Indonesian Christians
Moluccan people
Dayak people